Falkingham is a surname. Notable people with the surname include:

Edward Falkingham ( 1683–1757), Royal Navy officer
Gail Falkingham, British archaeologist, archivist, and curator
Jonathan Falkingham (born  1962), British architect and property developer
Josh Falkingham (born 1990), Scottish footballer
Thomas Falkingham (1884–1957), English-born Australian politician

See also
Folkingham, English village